Thialfi is a fictional character appearing in American comic books published by Marvel Comics. The character is adapted from Þjálfi, a character in Norse mythology by Dan Jurgens.

Character history

Childhood and Apotheosis
Thialfi began his life as a human boy centuries ago. Viking marauders from the north raided his peaceful Norse village and his parents ran for their lives. They were intercepted by a marauder, who brutally murdered his father and left Thialfi and his mother to die. Later, when the Vikings were celebrating their victory and giving praise to Odin and Asgard, a young and naive Thor appeared before them to join in their revelry. Thialfi's mother P'aesi interrupted them, however; she accused Thor of inciting the Vikings to murder, which Thor of course denied, claiming death was simply a consequence of battle. P'aesi assured Thor that there was no battle, merely the wholesale slaughter of a village, including women and children. Thor decided to see the battlefield and judge for himself, but as he walked away a Viking declared P'aesi a blasphemer and killed her,

that lead to success

Thor returned immediately and looked on the scene with horror. He chastised the Vikings for their brutality and told them that their gods urged them to defend themselves, not murder innocents. He flew P'aesi's corpse over to the battlefield, where the bodies of women and children were strewn alongside those of the men, just as P'aesi had said. Thialfi was there and, upon seeing P'aesi, ran over to her and began crying.

Thor yelled to his father Odin, who appeared before him. Odin responded that the humans behaved that way because they were inherently flawed, so it was best to just turn away. Thor was galled at Odin's apparent lack of compassion and demanded that he at least help Thialfi, who had been rendered an orphan because of the gods. Odin agreed despite Thor's insolent tone, but demanded a boon in return. He used the Odinforce to transform Thialfi into an Asgardian "blessed with wisdom, insight and speed enow to escape any enemy." His boon turned out to be that Thor find Thialfi a home in Asgard and that, upon Thialfi's coming of age, Thor return to him and treat him as he would his closest friend.

Royal Advisor
After Odin's death at the hands of Surtur, Thor ascended to the throne and followed Odin's instructions, taking Thialfi as his personal advisor. Thialfi's sudden inclusion in Thor's close-knit circle of allies caused some tension at first, especially with Balder, Thor's best friend since childhood. Eventually Thialfi proved himself—he saved Thor's life by delivering the Bloodaxe to him in battle against Desak—and was accepted. When the cabal of businessmen and political leaders made their strike against Asgard, Thialfi was caught in the turmoil. He noticed Zarrko escaping and tried to stop him, but he unwittingly ended up falling through Zarrko's temporal portal into the future.

Future Betrayal
Thialfi emerged in the year 2170 to find Earth completely transformed by Thor into New Asgard. At first Thialfi was overjoyed that Thor had finally managed to put the gods' power to use constructing a utopia for the humans Thialfi still identified with; but after Mistress Kya, the mutant sorceress daughter of the Scarlet Witch, and her band of resistance fighters showed him Mjolnir abandoned, Thialfi began to doubt Thor. His fears were confirmed when he witnessed Loki's police force quell an uprising through sheer brutality without even trying to find another solution. Thor's regime had benefitted some, but it had also robbed humanity of its self-reliance. After exchanging words with Thor's son Magni, which planted the same seed of doubt that Kya had given him, Thialfi resolved that, in order for humankind to regain its lost potential, Thor must die. He attempted to kill his friend and king the night he was to enter the Odinsleep. He misjudged the loyalty of Thor's inner circle, however. Thor's wife the Enchantress managed to free Odin's pet wolf Freki, who killed Thialfi.

Powers and abilities
Thialfi was transformed from a human being into a member of the Asgardian race by Odin. Thialfi had superhuman strength and a high resistance to injury due to the increased density of his Asgardian body, as well as an extremely long life span and immunity to all Earthly diseases. Odin enchanted Thialfi with a high degree of superhuman speed, as well.

Additionally, Thialfi presumably received training in the Asgardian arts of war granting him some proficiency in armed and unarmed combat.

Weapons and equipment
For situations where running was not enough, Thialfi used one of Asgard's many flying horses for transportation.

References

Marvel Comics Asgardians
Marvel Comics characters who can move at superhuman speeds
Marvel Comics characters with superhuman strength